The 2016 BBL-Pokal was the 49th season of the German Basketball Cup. The Final Four was held in Munich, which gained Bayern Munich automatic qualification. The other six participating teams were selected through the standings in the 2015–16 Basketball Bundesliga.

The third place game was not played due to wet spots on the court.

Participants
The following six teams qualified based on their standings in first half of the 2015–16 BBL.
Alba Berlin
Brose Baskets
Skyliners Frankfurt
MHP Riesen Ludwigsburg
EWE Baskets Oldenburg
s.Oliver Baskets
Bayern Munich was qualified as host team of the Final Four.

Bracket

Qualifying round

Semifinals

Final
Dragan Milosavljevic hit a game-winning floater with 5.6 seconds to go in the game, to lead Alba Berlin to its 9th Cup title.

References

External links
Official website

BBL-Pokal seasons
BBL-Pokal